Palaestinus was in Greek mythology a son of Poseidon and father of Haliacmon.  From grief at the death of his son, Palaestinus threw himself into the river, which was called after him Palaestinus, and subsequently Strymon.

References

Children of Poseidon